Franz Fehrenbach (born 1 July 1949 in Kenzingen) is a German engineer and manager who served as the chairman of Robert Bosch GmbH.

Career
Fehrenbach studied industrial engineering at the University of Karlsruhe and joined Robert Bosch GmbH in 1975. In 1988, he was transferred to the United States, but he returned to Germany in 1989. In 1990, Fehrenbach became Vice-CEO of the corporation. In 2003, he then became chairman of Robert Bosch GmbH, succeeding Hermann Scholl.

In 2012, Fehrenbach caused a stir by expressing his political view to expel Greece not only out of the Euro zone but also out of the European Union.

Other activities

Corporate boards
 Temasek Holdings, Member of the European Advisory Panel (since 2016)
 Linde, Deputy Chairman of the Supervisory Board (since 2013) 
 Stihl, Member of the Supervisory Board (2012–2023)
 BASF, Member of the Supervisory Board (2008–2022)

Non-profit organizations
 Allensbach Institute, Member of the Board of Trustees
 Baden-Badener Unternehmer-Gespräche (BBUG), Member of the Board of Trustees
 European School of Management and Technology (ESMT), Member of the Board of Trustees
 German Institute for International and Security Affairs (SWP), Member of the Council
 Stifterverband für die Deutsche Wissenschaft, Member of the Board 
 Trilateral Commission, Member of the European Group

Recognition
 2009 – Prize for Understanding and Tolerance, awarded by the Jewish Museum Berlin

References

Businesspeople from Baden-Württemberg
1949 births
Living people
Robert Bosch GmbH
People from Breisgau-Hochschwarzwald

 - article about Greece opinions